The Armenian Sailing Federation is the national governing body for the sport of sailing in Armenia, recognized by the International Sailing Federation. The headquarters of the Federation is located in Yerevan.

See also
 Sport in Armenia

References

External links 
 Armenian Sailing Federation on Facebook

 
Armenia
Sailing
Sailing
2004 establishments in Armenia